Emil Caras (born 21 December 1967) is a Moldovan professional football coach and a former player. He is an assistant coach with the Ukrainian club Dynamo Kyiv.

He made his professional debut in the Soviet Second League in 1985 for FC Zarya Bălţi.

For the last several years, he is currently working as a part of Mircea Lucescu's technical team as an assistant manager.

He is a nephew of Moldova national football team coach Ion Caras.

Honours

As player
Zimbru Chișinău
 Moldovan National Division (1): 1996.
Runner-up (2): 1995, 1997.

References

1967 births
Footballers from Chișinău
Living people
Soviet footballers
Moldovan footballers
Moldova international footballers
Russian Premier League players
Moldovan Super Liga players
FC Zimbru Chișinău players
FC Spumante Cricova players
FC Tyumen players
FC Tiraspol players
Moldovan football managers
FC Dacia Chișinău managers
FC Tiraspol managers
CSF Bălți players
CSF Bălți managers
Association football defenders
Moldovan expatriate sportspeople in Ukraine
Moldovan Super Liga managers
FC Dynamo Kyiv non-playing staff